John Peck may refer to:

John Peck (naval architect) (1725–1790), American merchant and naval architect of the revolution era
John Peck (footballer) (1937–1993), Australian rules footballer, played for Hawthorn, 1954–1968
John Peck (diplomat) (1913–1995), British ambassador to Senegal, 1962–1966, and Ireland, 1970–1973
John Peck (poet) (born 1941), American poet
John Peck (politician) (1922–2004), British communist politician
John Peck (cartoonist), cartoonist known as the Mad Peck
John C. Peck (1828–?), American businessman and building contractor 
John E. L. Peck (1918–2013), first permanent head of the computer science department at the University of British Columbia
J. Eddie Peck (John Edward Peck, born 1958), American actor
John H. Peck (1838–1919), tenth president of Rensselaer Polytechnic Institute
John J. Peck (1821–1878), U.S. soldier who fought in the Mexican–American War and American Civil War
John L. Peck (1857–1927), Canadian politician in the Legislative Assembly of New Brunswick
John Mason Peck (1789–1858), American Baptist missionary 
John Weld Peck (1874–1937), United States federal judge
John Weld Peck II (1913–1993), United States federal judge
John Peck (sergeant), American marine sergeant